O Adeus de Fellini (Portuguese for Fellini's Farewell) is the debut album by Brazilian post-punk band Fellini. It was released in 1985 via independent record label Baratos Afins and re-released in CD form in 1995, with an additional live track.

According to the band's frontman Cadão Volpato, the album's name is a nod to English post-punk band The Durutti Column's 1980 debut, The Return of the Durutti Column.

The track "Outro Endereço, Outra Vida" features samples of English disc jockey John Peel's voice.

"Zäune" is sung by Thomas Pappon, entirely in German.

Track listing

Notes
 "Funziona Senza Vapore" is also present in the compilation Não Wave, alongside another Fellini track, "Teu Inglês". It is also the name of a side project formed by Fellini's frontman Cadão Volpato in 1992.
 "Rock Europeu" is also present in the compilation The Sexual Life of the Savages, alongside another Fellini track, "Zum Zum Zum Zazoeira".

Personnel
Fellini
 Cadão Volpato — lead vocals (on tracks 1–9)
 Jair Marcos — acoustic and electric guitars
 Ricardo Salvagni — drums
 Thomas Pappon — bass, other instruments, lead vocals (on track 10)

Additional personnel
 Guinho — trumpet (on tracks 2, 6)
 Leonor — cello (on track 10)
 Teresa Berlink — female backing vocals (on track 3)

Miscellaneous staff
 Recorded in autumn 1985 in the Ônix project (8 channels), São Paulo, Brazil
 Fellini and Walter Silva — cover
 Luiz Carlos Calanca — phonographic production
 Fellini and Pappon — production, arrangement and mixing
 Luiz Carlos Calanca and Paulo Torres — remastering (cd version)
 Peter Price — mix-aid

References

External links
 O Adeus de Fellini at Fellini's official Bandcamp
 O Adeus de Fellini at Deezer
 Fellini on Baratos Afins' website 
 O Adeus de Fellini at Discogs
 O Adeus de Fellini at Rate Your Music
 O Adeus de Fellini at MusicBrainz

1985 debut albums
Fellini (band) albums
Portuguese-language albums